John Welles (died 1439 or after), of London and Southwark, Surrey, was an English Member of Parliament, spicer and property owner.

He was a Member (MP) of the Parliament of England for Lewes in April 1414, 1419 and 1431.

References

People from Lewes
15th-century deaths
English MPs April 1414
English MPs 1419
English MPs 1431